Walter Church (1829 – 28 February 1901) was an English-born Australian politician.

He was born in London to mariner John Foster Church and Barbara Ann George. He migrated to New South Wales around 1839 and became a custom house agent. On 1 September 1849 he married Annie Esther Stubbs, with whom he had eleven children. A second marriage on 22 April 1899 to Miriam Kate Cohen produced no children. From 1868 he worked as a grocer. In 1869 he was elected to the New South Wales Legislative Assembly for Goldfields West, serving until his defeat in 1872. Church died in Sydney in 1901.

References

 

1829 births
1901 deaths
Members of the New South Wales Legislative Assembly
19th-century Australian politicians
Mayors of Balmain
English emigrants to colonial Australia